Qadamgah-e Emam Reza (also Romanized as Qadamgāh-e Emām Reẕā) is a village in Tazian Rural District, in the Central District of Bandar Abbas County, Hormozgan Province, Iran. At the 2006 census, its population was 32, in 7 families.

References 

Populated places in Bandar Abbas County